The men's 50 kilometre freestyle at the FIS Nordic World Ski Championships 2009 took place on 1 March 2009 at 13:00 CET at Liberec.

Results

References

External links
Final results International Ski Federation (FIS)

FIS Nordic World Ski Championships 2009